The surface wave magnitude scale is one of the magnitude scales used in seismology to describe the size of an earthquake. It is based on measurements of Rayleigh surface waves that travel along the uppermost layers of the Earth. This magnitude scale is related to the local magnitude scale proposed by Charles Francis Richter in 1935, with modifications from both Richter and Beno Gutenberg throughout the 1940s and 1950s. It is currently used in People's Republic of China as a national standard (GB 17740-1999) for categorising earthquakes.

Definition
The formula to calculate surface wave magnitude is:

where A is the maximum particle displacement in surface waves (vector sum of the two horizontal displacements) in μm, T is the corresponding period in s (usually 20 2 seconds), Δ is the epicentral distance in °, and

Several versions of this equation were derived throughout the 20th century, with minor variations in the constant values.

For official use by the Chinese government, the two horizontal displacements must be measured at the same time or within 1/8 of a period; if the two displacements have different periods, a weighted sum must be used:

where AN is the north–south displacement in μm,　AE is the east–west displacement in μm,　TN is the period corresponding to AN in s, and TE is the period corresponding to AE in s.

Other studies
Vladimír Tobyáš and Reinhard Mittag proposed to relate surface wave magnitude to local magnitude scale ML, using

Other formulas include three revised formulae proposed by CHEN Junjie et al.:

and

See also
Seismic magnitude scales

Notes and references

External links

Seismic magnitude scales